Gordon Clair Helsel, Jr. (born January 9, 1947) is a former member of the Virginia House of Delegates and former mayor of Poquoson, Virginia. He represented the 91st district, which includes Poquoson and part of the neighboring city of Hampton. A retired businessman, Helsel previously served on the city council (1982–1990), as vice mayor (1990–1994), and as mayor (1996–2010) of Poquoson.

Legislative positions
While serving as a member of the House of Delegates, Helsel's voting record angered many conservative Republicans, including his vote to expand Medicaid in Virginia, and his vote to defeat the "Tebow Bill". He retired before facing a primary challenger in 2019.

References

1947 births
Republican Party members of the Virginia House of Delegates
Politicians from Hampton, Virginia
Mayors of places in Virginia
Living people
21st-century American politicians
Thomas Nelson Community College alumni
People from Poquoson, Virginia